Robo Ghost is the second studio album by Scottish rock and electronic music band Keser.

Overview
Robo Ghost was recorded in 2008–09 at the studio of Alex Tronic Records in Edinburgh, Scotland, and was produced by Paul Croan. The album features guitar-driven electronic music and is predominantly instrumental.

Track listing

 "Jimmy Wah" – 4:56
 "Chiaroscuro" – 5:08
 "Splice the Glitch" – 4:33
 "If I Only Took a Photograph" – 4:08
 "Acts of Dog" – 6:13
 "Sesevenen" – 3:37
 "Shiny Green Suit" – 3:05
 "Diablo Canyon 1" – 3:43
 "3 Point Play (Set Piece)" – 3:19
 "Nonchalant Repartee" – 4:04
 "Nerd Ensemble" – 3:11
 "Arizona State" – 11:22

Personnel
 Paul Croan – producer
 Gavin Clark – bass, keyboards, programming
 Kevan Whitley – guitar, keyboards, programming
 Dan Bartley – album artwork

Trivia
Most of the song titles on the album are references or tributes to basketball, football, the Simpsons, the American humourist Maddox, and several movies, including Seven, the Matrix, and Good Morning, Vietnam.

Release history
Robo_Ghost was released worldwide in 2009 via UK label Alex Tronic Records. The label's distribution includes Cargo Records for the UK and Arabesque for the rest of the world.

References

Keser albums
2009 albums
Alex Tronic Records albums